Apollyon (Απολλυων) is the Greek name for Abaddon, the spiritual being (or place) named as the destroyer (or place of destruction), the exterminator, in Christian apocalyptic theology.

Apollyon or Appolyon may also refer to:

 Apollyon (novel), a novel in the Left Behind sequence, by Tim LaHaye and Jerry B. Jenkins
 Apollyon, a demon appearing in The Pilgrim's Progress by John Bunyan
 Apollyon, an incarnation of the Marvel Comics character Fantomex in the X-Men storyline Here Comes Tomorrow
 Apollyon Pringle, a character in the Harry Potter series
 Appolyon (CrossGen), a comic book character in the Sigilverse created by CrossGen Entertainment
 Apollyon (musician), aka Ole Moe, a black metal multi-instrumentalist
 Apollyon, is a 1996 album by Thou Art Lord, a Hellenic-Black Metal supergroup
 Apollyon, a character in the 2017 video game For Honor
 Apollyon, a character in the Afterbith+ expansion for the 2014 video game The Binding of Isaac: Rebirth
Apollyon, a classification for potentially world-destroying and uncontainable SCP objects in the fictional SCP Foundation universe